The 2003 Baseball World Cup (BWC) was the 35th international Men's amateur baseball tournament. The tournament was sanctioned by the International Baseball Federation, which titled it the Amateur World Series from the 1938 tournament through the 1986 AWS. The tournament was held, for the ninth time, in Cuba, from October 12 to 25 in the cities of Havana, Matanzas, Santiago de Cuba and Holguín.

Cuba defeated Panama in the final, winning its 24th title.

There were 15 participating countries, split into two groups, with the first four of each group qualifying for the finals. Guam qualified as runner up of the Oceania World Cup Qualifier but did not take part in the tournament.

The next four competitions were also held as the BWC tournament, which was replaced in 2015 by the quadrennial WBSC Premier12.

Venues

First round

Pool A

Standings

Schedule and results

Pool B

Standings

Schedule and results

Playoffs

Bracket

Quarter-finals

5th–8th place

Semi-finals

7th place game

5th place game

Bronze medal game

Final

Final standings

Awards

References

External links
XXXV Baseball World Cup - XXXV Copa del Mundo de Béisbol

Baseball World Cup
2003
2003 in baseball
Cuba national baseball team
2003 in Cuban sport
October 2003 sports events in North America
Baseball competitions in Havana
21st century in Havana